Rehab: Party at the Hard Rock Hotel is an American reality television docudrama on TruTV that premiered on November 11, 2008. It focuses on the staff (bartenders, cocktail waitresses, security, etc.) of the Rehab pool party hosted at the Las Vegas Hard Rock Hotel and Casino and also chronicles the staff as they attempt to keep the partygoers under control while trying to do their jobs well and avoid their bosses' anger.

The series ran for 3 seasons until its cancellation in December 2010. Main cast members include Matt Minichino, Julia Velotas, Chantel Corradino and Sharon Meyers

Cast

Recurring Cast
Matthew Minichino — Director of Nightlife
Sharon Meyers — Special Events Security Supervisor
Julia Velotas - Lead cocktail server 
Chantel Corradino and Jessica Snook  - Bartenders
Amanda Caldwell and Jonna Mannion — Cocktail Servers
Jake - Security Guard
Doug Hayes

Lawsuit
In September 2010 the owner of the Hard Rock brand filed a lawsuit against the company which acquired the rights to the name of the hotel, Morgans Hotel Group, stating that the show has damaged the company name by associating it with "drunken debauchery, acts of vandalism, sexual harassment, (and) violence." Despite the lawsuit, truTV ran the third season. Morgans Hotel Group argued that "This show and the lively behavior it portrays have already been on the air for two years... it has brought enormous popularity to the Hard Rock brand.

Undercover drug sting
In 2010, undercover police officers investigated security guards and VIP hosts who were allegedly selling drugs to guests and allowing (at least on one occasion) an undercover officer to smoke marijuana in a public restroom after bribing a security guard. These stings occurred at the now-closed Body English and Vanity nightclubs also on the Hard Rock Hotel property and featured on the show. Hard Rock Hotel has reportedly fired all employees listed in the complaint, and agreed to pay a $700,000 fine.

References

External links
Rehab: Party at the Hard Rock Hotel on TruTV.com

2000s American reality television series
2010s American reality television series
2008 American television series debuts
2010 American television series endings
English-language television shows
Television shows set in the Las Vegas Valley
TruTV original programming
Hard Rock Hotel and Casino (Las Vegas)